Shaver Creek is a tributary of Muddy Creek in the U.S. state of Missouri, in Pettis County.

Shaver Creek has the name of the local Shaver family.

See also
List of rivers of Missouri

References

Rivers of Pettis County, Missouri
Rivers of Missouri